The 2026 FIFA World Cup bidding process resulted in the Fédération Internationale de Football Association (FIFA) selecting the joint United States / Canada / Mexico bid as the location for the 2026 FIFA World Cup.

Two bids to host the event were submitted to FIFA, a joint bid by Canada, Mexico and the United States, and one by Morocco. On 13 June 2018, at the 68th FIFA Congress in Moscow, the joint bid was selected by 134 votes to Morocco's 65. This will be the first tournament hosted by more than two countries, and only the second hosted by more than one country—the other having been the 2002 tournament, hosted by South Korea and Japan.

Upon this selection, each country made hosting records of their own. Canada becomes the fifth country to host both men's and women's World Cup—the latter having been in 2015; Mexico becomes the first country to host the men's World Cup three times—having done so previously in 1970 and 1986; and the United States becomes the first country to host both men's and women's World Cup twice—having hosted the 1994 men's and the 1999 and 2003 women's World Cups.

Background
The FIFA Council (and its proceeding Executive Committee) went back and forth between 2013 and 2017 on limitations within hosting rotation based on the continental confederations. Originally, it was set that bids to be host would not be allowed from countries belonging to confederations that hosted the two preceding tournaments. It was temporarily changed to only prohibit countries belonging to the confederation that hosted the previous World Cup from bidding to host the following tournament, before the rule was changed back to its prior state of two World Cups. However, the FIFA Council did make an exception to potentially grant eligibility to member associations of the confederation of the second-to-last host of the FIFA World Cup in the event that none of the received bids fulfill the strict technical and financial requirements. In March 2017, FIFA president Gianni Infantino confirmed that "Europe (UEFA) and Asia (AFC) are excluded from the bidding following the selection of Russia and Qatar in 2018 and 2022 respectively." Therefore, the 2026 World Cup could be hosted by one of the remaining four confederations: CONCACAF (last hosted in 1994), CAF (last hosted in 2010), CONMEBOL (last hosted in 2014), or OFC (never hosted before), or potentially by UEFA in case no bid from those four met the requirements.

Co-hosting the FIFA World Cup, which had been banned by FIFA after the 2002 World Cup, was approved for the 2026 FIFA World Cup, though not limited to a specific number but instead evaluated on a case-by-case basis. Also by 2026, the FIFA general secretariat, after consultation with the Competitions Committee, will have the power to exclude bidders who do not meet the minimum technical requirements to host the competition.

Bid process
The bidding process was due to start in 2015, with the appointment of hosts scheduled for the FIFA Congress on 10 May 2017 in Kuala Lumpur, Malaysia, but was postponed due to the 2015 FIFA corruption case and the subsequent resignation of Sepp Blatter and resumed following the FIFA Council meeting on 10 May 2016, with a final decision in May 2020, amid corruption allegations around the previous tournaments, due to be held in 2018 (Russia), as well as in 2022 (Qatar).

The original bidding process originally consisted of four phases:
May 2016 – May 2017: a new strategy and consultation phase
June 2017 – December 2018: enhanced phases for bid preparation
January 2019 –  February 2020: bid evaluation
May 2020: final decision

The consultation phase focused on four areas:
The inclusion of human rights requirements, sustainable event management, environmental protection in the bidding
Principle of exclusion of bidders that do not meet technical requirements
Review of the current stance on joint bids
Number of teams

On 7 November 2017, FIFA published a guide to bidding process. It outlines the key elements of the reformed bidding process, the assessment mechanisms in place, recommendations on the protection of the process' integrity, the timeline for the selection of the host(s), the specific requirements for hosting, a detailed explanation of the government guarantees, as well as the principles of sustainable event management and human rights protection.

Bid Evaluation Task Force
On 27 October 2017, the FIFA Council ratified the decision of the Bureau of the Council of 6 September 2017 to approve the enhanced Bidding Regulations for the 2026 FIFA World Cup. It also appointed the members of the Bid Evaluation Task Force. According to the Bidding Regulations, the Task Force is expected to be composed by:
Tomaž Vesel: chairman of the Audit & Compliance Committee
Mukul Mudgal: chairman of the Governance Committee
Ilco Gjorgioski: member of the Organising Committee for FIFA Competitions
Zvonimir Boban: FIFA Deputy General Secretary (Football)
Marco Villiger: FIFA Deputy General Secretary (Administration)

Fast track bid process
With no rival bid having emerged since April 2017 the CONCACAF member federations of Canada, Mexico and the United States sent a joint request to FIFA to hasten the bid process. Canada, Mexico and the United States wanted FIFA to award the bid outside the traditional bidding process at the June 2018 FIFA Congress in Moscow if the CONCACAF-bid meets FIFA requirements.

However the FIFA Council proposed on 8 May 2017 that FIFA shall establish a bidding procedure inviting initially only the member associations of CAF, CONCACAF, CONMEBOL and the OFC – continental confederations whose members have not hosted the two previous World Cups – as candidates to submit to FIFA bids to host the final competition of the 2026 FIFA World Cup by 11 August 2017. The 68th FIFA Congress will decide on the selection of the candidate host associations.

On 11 May 2017, the 67th FIFA Congress voted on the FIFA Council proposal to the fast-track the 2026 FIFA World Cup bid process and set the following deadlines:

Updated bidding process:

May 2016 – May 2017: a new strategy and consultation phase
June 2017 – December 2017: enhanced phases for bid preparation
March 2018 –  June 2018: bid evaluation
June 2018: final decision

Deadlines:

11 August 2017: any other nations interested in bidding have to express interest
16 March 2018:  bidders must meet a list of FIFA's technical specifications, and bids must be officially submitted by then
13 June 2018: the 68th FIFA Congress will decide on whether to select one of the official bids. Should neither be selected, further member associations, including those from AFC and UEFA and excluding the initial bidders, will be invited to bid, and in this scenario, a final decision would be taken by the 70th FIFA Congress in May 2020.

Bid requirements
Endorsement of a set of principles submitted by the FIFA administration as part of the process to select the host of the 2026 FIFA World Cup, including an overview of the content to be requested from bidding member associations and high-level hosting requirements. These include: stadium and infrastructure requirements; principles of sustainable event management, human rights and environmental protection; and details on aspects such as governmental support documents, the organisational model to be adopted and provisions for the establishment of a legacy fund. A complete version of the bid requirements will eventually be dispatched to member associations that register to take part in the process.

Stadiums requirements
FIFA have established minimum requirements for stadiums capacities.

Team and referee facilities
FIFA established minimum requirements for team and referee facilities.

Official bids
Under FIFA rules as of 2017, the 2026 Cup cannot be in either Europe (UEFA) or Asia (AFC), leaving an African (CAF) bid, a North American (CONCACAF) bid, a South American (CONMEBOL) bid, or an Oceania (OFC) bid as the only possible options. In March 2017, FIFA confirmed that "Europe (UEFA) and Asia (AFC) are excluded from the bidding following the selection of Russia and Qatar in 2018 and 2022 respectively."

CAF

Moroccan Minister of Youth and Sports, Moncef Belkhayat, stated that: "The African Cup of Nations 2015 will be the first indicator of our ability to host a great event. Then we can confidently consider us as a candidate to host the World Cup 2026". However, in November 2014, Morocco asked to postpone the African Cup of Nations to summer due to the Ebola virus epidemic in West Africa, and lost its hosting rights in favor of Equatorial Guinea.

Morocco lost bids to host the World Cup in 1994, 1998, 2006, and 2010 to the United States, France, Germany, and South Africa, respectively. 
Morocco successfully hosted the 2013 and 2014 FIFA Club World Cups and the 2018 African Nations Championship.
On 11 August 2017, Morocco officially announced a bid to host the 2026 FIFA World Cup.
If successful, it would have been the second African country, after the 2010 tournament in South Africa.

CONCACAF
 /  / 

Following rumors on each nation bidding individually, the three nations announced on 10 April 2017 a bid to host the World Cup jointly. Canada and Mexico would host 10 games each, while the United States would host the remaining 60 games, including all remaining matches from the quarterfinals onward.

The 2026 tournament will be the first to be held in three countries. Mexico is the first nation to serve three World Cups, having already hosted the 1970 and 1986 men's tournaments. It will be the first men's tournament and second overall to be held in Canada after the 2015 women's tournament, and the second men's and fourth overall in the United States, after the 1994 men's and the 1999 and 2003 women's tournaments.

Bid evaluation report
Some of the main requirements addressed by FIFA are security, finance and hospitality, and Morocco fulfills all these requirements as this has been proven by the outcome of the FIFA Task Force: The note was 2,7 from the total of 5 points. Additionally the travel time between the proposed venues is manageable, since all the venues are within a one-hour flight of Casablanca. Another point is the suitable global time, because in Morocco the Greenwich Mean Time (GMT) is the local time and therefore a large number of countries can watch the live transmission of the games in a suitable time. Finally the proximity to Europe is a good advantage for a large number of European supporters.

However, multiple risks exist for FIFA with the bid. In its evaluation report, Morocco received high risk options for stadiums, accommodation and transportation. Overall the bid was labelled as high risk and the United joint bid was rated as low risk to FIFA.

2026 World Cup host election results
203 of the 211 member associations of FIFA were able to vote. 

The eight ineligible associations were as follows: 
 The four bidding nations, Morocco, Canada, Mexico and the United States, and three organized unincorporated territories of the U.S. (Guam, Puerto Rico and the U.S. Virgin Islands) were ineligible to vote. American Samoa, an unorganized unincorporated territory of the U.S., was allowed to vote.
 Ghana was barred from voting after the country's FA was suspended amid a corruption scandal.

The United bid won receiving 134 votes, while the Morocco bid received 65 votes. No representative within their home confederation CONCACAF voted against the United bid, whilst eleven representatives within their home confederation CAF voted against the Morocco bid. The Brazil representative voted for the Morocco bid reportedly thinking the vote was private, despite its home confederation CONMEBOL having endorsed the United bid overall. Iran voted for the option "None of the bids", while Cuba, Slovenia and Spain abstained from voting.

Election results by association

Broadcasting rights 
  – CTV, TSN, RDS
  – Fox, Telemundo
  - Canal 5, Azteca 7.<ref
name=TUDN></ref>

On 12 February 2015, Fox, Telemundo, and Bell Media's rights to the tournament were renewed by FIFA to cover 2026, without accepting any other bids. The New York Times believed that this extension was intended as compensation for the rescheduling of the 2022 World Cup to November–December rather than its traditional June–July scheduling, which falls during the heart of the National Football League season (where Fox is currently a main U.S. rightsholder), and the beginning of the National Basketball Association and National Hockey League seasons.

References and notes

Notes

References 

 
World Cup bids
World Cup bids
World Cup bids